In poetry, a monometer is a line of verse with just one metrical foot.

Example
Monometer can be exemplified by this portion of Robert Herrick's poem "Upon His Departure Hence":
Thus I
Passe by,
And die:
As one,
Unknown,
And gone.

See also
Trochaic
Foot (prosody)

References

External links
Upon his departure

Types of verses

In Manufacturing, a monometer is a furnace Manufacturer

Example
A Monometer Rotary furnace incorporates the latest technology and has introduced hydraulic tilting and sophisticated electronic and micro-processing devices which sequences the speed of furnace rotation during melting, and varies the Oxyfuel firing rates according to process requirement. It is the modern tool for melting economically and reliably in a pollution-free environment. The efficient thermal transfer of heat as the furnace rotates, together with efficient recovery of heat from the waste gases or Oxyfuel burner system, lead to fast melting rates and high metal temperatures if required in excess of 1550 deg C.  
Monometer Rotary furnaces are equally efficient as a Duplexing furnace for super-heating and Holding metal for prolonged periods operating alongside cupolas or induction furnaces. 

Monometer is a brand of furnace designed by British Engineering company Monometer Holdings Ltd- specialising in furnace design, specification and manufacture using the latest heat treatment technology, and providing professional consultation services since 1913.

External links
https://www.monometer.co.uk,
https://www.monometer.co.uk/rotary-furnaces